The 1965 Alabama Crimson Tide football team (variously "Alabama", "UA" or "Bama") represented the University of Alabama in the 1965 NCAA University Division football season. It was the Crimson Tide's 71st overall and 32nd season as a member of the Southeastern Conference (SEC). The team was led by head coach Bear Bryant, in his eighth year, and played their home games at Denny Stadium in Tuscaloosa, Legion Field in Birmingham and Ladd Stadium in Mobile, Alabama. They finished season with nine wins, one loss and one tie (9–1–1 overall, 6–1–1 in the SEC), as SEC champions and with a victory over Nebraska in the Orange Bowl. Alabama was also recognized as national champions by the AP Poll after their Orange Bowl win.

Alabama opened the season ranked No. 5, but were upset by Georgia 18–17 in the first game of the season. They rebounded with their first win of the season over Tulane and followed that with a 17–16 win over Ole Miss in a game in which Alabama had to rally from a nine-point fourth quarter deficit for the victory. The next week, the Crimson Tide defeated Vanderbilt in Nashville before they returned home for their rivalry game against Tennessee. Against the Volunteers, the score was deadlocked 7–7 in the closing seconds, but Alabama had driven to the Tennessee four-yard line. Ken Stabler believing that it was third down, threw the ball out of bounds with six seconds left to stop the clock. However, it was actually fourth down, possession went to Tennessee, and the game ended in a tie.

After the tie, the Crimson Tide won five in a row over Florida State, Mississippi State, LSU, South Carolina and Auburn en route to Bryant's fourth SEC title at Alabama. Because the Associated Press was holding its vote until after the bowl games instead of before for the first time, No. 4 Alabama still had a chance to win the national championship when they played No. 3 Nebraska in the Orange Bowl. On New Year's Day, No. 1 Michigan State lost in the Rose Bowl and No. 2 Arkansas lost in the Cotton Bowl Classic, and Alabama defeated Nebraska 39–28 in the Orange Bowl and captured its third AP National Championship in five years.

Schedule

Game summaries

Georgia

Sources:

To open the 1965 season, the No. 5 Crimson Tide were upset by the Georgia Bulldogs 18–17 at Athens. After a scoreless first quarter, Georgia took a 10–0 lead on a 37-yard Bob Etter field goal and when George Patton intercepted a Steve Sloan pass and returned it 55-yards for a touchdown in the second quarter. Alabama then made the halftime score 10–3 with a 26-yard David Ray field goal. The Crimson Tide then tied the game in the third on an eight-yard Steve Bowman run and took their only lead of the game in the fourth on a two-yard Sloan touchdown run. The Bulldogs then scored their second touchdown late in the fourth quarter when Pat Hodgson lateraled a Kirby Moore pass to Bob Taylor who took it 73-yards for a touchdown. Georgia then successfully made a two-point conversion that gave them an 18–17 victory. The loss brought Alabama's all-time record against Georgia to 28–19–4.

Tulane

Sources:

After their loss to Georgia in the season opener, the Crimson Tide dropped out of the rankings prior to their game against Tulane. At Mobile, the Crimson Tide shutout the Green Wave 27–0 in their annual Ladd Stadium game of the season. The Crimson Tide took a 10–0 first quarter lead on a 37-yard David Ray field goal followed by a one-yard Leslie Kelley touchdown run, and then extended it to 17–0 at halftime with a 29-yard Steve Sloan touchdown pass to Tommy Tolleson in the second. Alabama then closed the game with a 15-yard Sloan touchdown pass to Richard Thompson in the third and a 25-yard Ray field goal in the fourth for the 27–0 win. The victory improved Alabama's all-time record against Tulane to 23–10–3.

Ole Miss

Sources:

For their third game of the season, Alabama met rival Ole Miss during the regular season for the first time since the 1944 season. In a night game at Legion Field, a nine-yard Steve Sloan touchdown run with just over a minute left in the game gave Alabama a 17–16 victory over the Rebels. Ole Miss took an early 3–0 lead on a 34-yard Jimmy Keyes field goal in the first quarter and then extended it to 9–0 in the second on an eight-yard James Heidel touchdown pass to Donald Street. Sloan then got Alabama on the scoreboard near the end of the second quarter on a five-yard touchdown run that made the halftime score 9–7. After a scoreless third, the Rebels extended their lead to 16–7 on a one-yard Heidel touchdown run before the Crimson Tide rallied for the victory.

David Ray scored first with his 37-yard field goal that made the score 16–10 in favor of Ole Miss, and then with 1:19 left in the game Sloan scored the game-tying touchdown on a nine-yard run. On the next play, Ray successfully converted the extra point and gave Alabama a 17–16 lead. The Crimson Tide then secured the victory on the next play when the Rebels' Stan Moss fumbled kickoff that was recovered by Alabama who then ran out the clock and won the game. The victory improved Alabama's all-time record against Ole Miss 18–3–2.

Vanderbilt

Sources:

After they trailed for the majority of the game, Alabama rallied with 22 fourth quarter points and defeated the Commodores 22–7 at Nashville. After a scoreless first quarter, the Commodores took a 7–0 lead after Charles Boyd returned a punt 69-yards for a touchdown in the second. Vanderbilt remained in the lead through the fourth quarter when Alabama scored a trio of touchdowns. Steve Bowman scored first on a two-yard run, followed by a 35-yard John Reitz interception return and then on a 57-yard Bowman run late in the game. The victory improved Alabama's all-time record against Vanderbilt to 23–16–4.

Tennessee

Sources:

In a game that saw multiple turnovers result in failed touchdown opportunities, Alabama tied the rival Tennessee Volunteers 7–7 at Legion Field. After a scoreless first quarter, both teams scored their only touchdown in the second. Stan Mitchell scored first for the Vols on a one-yard run and Steve Sloan followed for Alabama with his one-yard run. The Crimson Tide had a chance to win the game in the final minute of the game. With only 0:36 remaining in the game, Alabama had possession at the Tennessee six-yard line. However, Alabama quarterback Ken Stabler thought the Tide gained a first down on the previous play and threw the ball out-of-bounds on a fourth down play and turned the ball over on downs back to the Vols. Tennessee then ran out the clock for the tie. The tie brought Alabama's all-time record against Tennessee to 22–19–7.

Florida State

Sources:

In what was their first all-time game against Florida State, the Crimson Tide shutout the Seminoles 21–0 on homecoming in Tuscaloosa. Alabama took a 13–0 halftime lead after Leslie Kelley scored on a one-yard touchdown run in the first and Steve Sloan scored on a two-yard touchdown run in the second quarter. After a scoreless third, the Crimson Tide closed the game with a second one-yard Kelley touchdown run in the fourth quarter coupled with a Ken Stabler two-point conversion that made the final score 21–0.

Mississippi State

Sources:

At the Mississippi Veterans Memorial Stadium, a pair of Bobby Johns turnovers in the fourth quarter preserved a 10–7 win over the Mississippi State Bulldogs. The Crimson Tide took an early 7–0 lead after Steve Sloan threw a 65-yard touchdown pass to Dennis Homan in the first quarter. They then extended their lead to 10–0 in the third quarter on a 27-yard David Ray field goal before the Bulldogs scored their only points on an eleven-yard Ashby Cook touchdown pass to Marcus Rhoden later in the quarter. In the fourth, Johns preserved the Crimson Tide win with his blocked field goal and interception late in the game. The victory improved Alabama's all-time record against Mississippi State to 37–10–3.

LSU

Sources:

After their victory over Mississippi State, Alabama moved into the No. 5 position in the AP Poll prior to their game against LSU. Against the Tigers, the Crimson Tide won 31–7 at Tiger Stadium. Alabama scored their first touchdown early on a 45-yard Steve Sloan pass to Dennis Homan for a 7–0 first quarter lead. 17 second quarter points scored on a two-yard Steve Bowman run, a six-yard Sloan pass to David Ray and a 41-yard Ray field goal made the halftime score 24–0 in favor of the visitors. After Bowman scored on a 35-yard run in the third, LSU scored their only points in the fourth on a 53-yard Pat Screen touchdown pass to Joe Labruzzo that made the final score 31–7. The victory improved Alabama's all-time record against LSU to 17–8–4.

South Carolina

Sources:

In their second non-conference game of the season, Alabama defeated the South Carolina Gamecocks 35–14 at Denny Stadium. The Crimson Tide took an early 7–0 lead after Steve Sloan scored on a two-yard touchdown run in the first quarter. After they extended their lead on a two-yard Steve Bowman touchdown run, the Gamecocks responded with their first touchdown on a seven-yard Michael L. Fair pass to J. R. Wilburn that made the score 14–7. Alabama then scored a pair of touchdowns on Sloan passes to Dennis Homan, the first from 50 and the second from 39 yards. South Carolina answered with a two-yard Phil Branson touchdown run and then Alabama with a two-yard Ken Stabler touchdown run that made the final score 35–14. In the game, Sloan eclipsed the previous team records for both pass completions and yardage in a single season formerly held by Joe Namath. The victory improved Alabama's all-time record against South Carolina to 5–0.

Auburn

Sources:

In the annual Iron Bowl game, Alabama defeated the Auburn Tigers 30–3 and secured their second consecutive SEC championship. Alabama took a 15–0 lead late into the second quarter with Steve Sloan touchdown passes of 11-yards to Tommy Tolleson, 33-yards to Ray Perkins and a 27-yard David Ray field goal. Auburn then ended the shutout bid just before halftime on a 44-yard Don Lewis field goal that made the score 15–3. The Crimson Tide then closed the game with a two-yard Leslie Kelley touchdown in the third and a 29-yard Sloan touchdown pass to Don Shankles in the fourth that made the final score 30–3. The victory improved Alabama's all-time record against Auburn to 15–14–1.

Nebraska

Sources:

For the second year in a row, Alabama played in the Orange Bowl. In the 1966 edition of the game, the Crimson Tide defeated the Nebraska Cornhuskers 39–28 and finished the season 9–1–1 and as AP national champions.

National championship claim

The NCAA recognizes consensus national champions as the teams that have captured a championship by way of one of the major polls since the 1950 NCAA University Division football season. As they entered the Orange Bowl, the Crimson Tide was ranked fourth by the AP behind Michigan State, Arkansas and Nebraska. After losses by the Spartans and Razorbacks in their bowl game coupled with an Alabama victory over Nebraska in their contest, the AP, voting after the bowls for the first time, vaulted the Crimson Tide into the No. 1 position in the final poll of the season and won the national championship. Michigan State was also recognized as national champions by various other selectors for the 1965 season, including the UPI Coaches Poll.

NFL/AFL Draft
Several players that were varsity lettermen from the 1965 squad were drafted into the National Football League (NFL) and the American Football League (AFL) between the 1966 and 1968 drafts. These players included the following:

Freshman squad
Prior to the 1972 NCAA University Division football season, NCAA rules prohibited freshmen from participating on the varsity team, and as such many schools fielded freshmen teams. The Alabama freshmen squad finished the 1965 season with a record of three wins and one loss (3–1). The Baby Tide opened their season with a 7–6 loss at Mississippi State. After a scoreless first quarter, the Bulldogs took a 7–0 lead in the second when Ronnie Coleman threw an 11-yard touchdown pass to Harry Ivey. Although the Alabama defense only allowed State only two first downs for the remainder of the game, the Baby Tide lost 7–6 after a failed two-point conversion attempt that followed a 26-yard Joe Kelley touchdown pass to Donnie Sutton.

Alabama then won their first game of the season at Denny Stadium with a 27–14 victory over Ole Miss. Ole Miss took an early 7–0 lead on a 12-yard Jimmy Wallis touchdown pass to Glenn Cannon. Alabama responded with the next four touchdowns and took a 27–7 lead. Touchdowns were scored on runs of 19-yards by Dave Beddingfield, 25-yards by Mickey Lee, three-yards by Frank Chambers run and on a 61-yard Kelley pass to Conrad Fowler. The Rebels then scored their final points as time expired on a 73-yard Terry Collier touchdown pass to Cannon. In their third game, Alabama defeated Tennessee 19–8 at Neyland Stadium. Alabama took an early 7–0 lead after Donnie Johnston scored on a two-yard touchdown run in the first quarter. After a pair of Myles Prestige field goals, the Baby Tide extended their lead to 19–0 with a second half touchdown. Tennessee responded late with their only touchdown on a four-yard Nick Showalter touchdown run in the fourth quarter.

Two weeks later, Alabama closed the season with a 30–6 victory over rival Auburn at Cliff Hare Stadium. After Baby Tide took a 7–0 first quarter lead on short Frank Chambers run, Auburn scored their only points on a 96-yard return by Larry Ellis on the kickoff that ensued. The Baby Tide then closed the game with 23 unanswered points scored on a one-yard Kelley run, a 20-yard Prestige field goal, a 52-yard Don Matthews punt return and on a nine-yard Johnston reverse.

Personnel

Varsity letter winners

Coaching staff

References
General

 
 

Specific

Alabama
Alabama Crimson Tide football seasons
College football national champions
Southeastern Conference football champion seasons
Orange Bowl champion seasons
Alabama Crimson Tide football